El Santos vs. la Tetona Mendoza is a  2012 Mexican adult animated comedy film based on José Ignacio Solórzano and Trino Camacho's comic strip series.

The film features an ensemble voice cast of famous Mexican actors, led by Daniel Giménez Cacho, José María Yazpik, Héctor Jiménez, Regina Orozco, and Cheech Marin. It is produced by Ánima Estudios under its adult label Átomo Films and distributed by Videocine.

It was released in Mexico on 30 November 2012.

Plot
Santos suffers with the divorce from Tetona, while the people live and work with the group of regenerative zombies in Sahuayo. When Tetona arrives, she orders Santos to kill the zombies. Santos and Cabo Valdivia learn that if anyone kills all zombies will become the town's savior. Santos challenges Killer Peyote to make sure who will win the love for Tetona. Santos fails to kill the zombies, but Peyote uses a truck to lure them through the canyon cliff. Despite Santos' failure, the officers inform him about the town's abnormal situation. Tetona summons the female group of aliens from outer space. As Santos, Cabo and Peyote evade them, they wander around town. At the science room, Santos and Cabo inspect the remains of the zombie virus on the plate. It is later destroyed by Peyote, whom the aliens recruited. They imprisoned one of the male adults and force the female ones to work at the strip club. Santos and his captured friends are forced to stay in prison. Cabo, revealing to be one of the zombies, asks Santos to protect him and the zombies, before the decontaminated population can annihilate them. Santos and his friends win the first round in the game of soccer, but the others plan to escape. After losing the game in the second round, Santos and his friends escape from prison, being rescued by saddlers. After Santos uses DNA cell samples to spread the infection for everyone and revive the zombie population, he goes to the palace and confronts Peyote. The fight at the strip ensues, until Peyote slips on an avocado, suffers a bone fracture and ends up on a wheelchair. Santos goes to the bathroom, urinates the smoking weed from the bowel that he accidentally swallowed, and suggests for Tetona to forgive him. The married couple have children.

Voice cast
Daniel Giménez Cacho as Santos, an unemployed wrestler and Tetona's husband
José María Yazpik as Killer Peyote, Santos' drug dealing rival
Héctor Jiménez as Cabo Valdivia, Santos' police friend and one of the zombies
Regina Orozco as Tetona Mendoza, Santos' wife
Guillermo del Toro as Gamborimbo Ponx, Santos' talking orange
Cheech Marin as El Charro Negro

Release
The film was released in Mexico on 30 November 2012. It was shown at the Annecy International Film Festival on 10 June 2013.

Box office
The film opened at #6 at the box office, earning $3.6 million MXN ($0.28 million USD).

References

External links
Official website 

2012 films
Alien visitations in films
Films about drugs
Films set in Mexico
Lucha libre films
Mexican comics
Mexican animated films
2010s Spanish-language films
Ánima Estudios films
Zombie comedy films
Adult animated films
2010s Mexican films
Adult animated comedy films